Jesús Calderón is a Spanish composer. He has composed many soundtracks for short films, documentaries, animation films, etc.

Biography
From an early age, he was interested in music and composition, and studied in the conservatory with the piano as main instrument.
Soon he discovered the electronic music of the '70s: Jean Michel Jarre, Mike Oldfield and Kraftwerk, among others, and began to be interested in music composition using synthesizers and the first PC sequencers, creating several themes under these influences, that were recorded into several albums.
The film music and soundtracks were very fascinating to him, and he began to compose his first works with a Hollywood cinema sound for several projects that were offering to him.
We can find many different genres in his music: electronic music, symphonic, piano solos, works for orchestra and choir, etc.

He has composed music for short films, animation films and documentaries for directors from 5 different countries. Now he is writing the music and lyrics for a musical show that will be opened in Madrid.
He composed his first score for a 3D animation film directed by Rob Dollase: Dry Sky. This soundtrack was nominee for the best music in short film in the "Jerry Goldsmith Awards", and he won the "Gold Medal for Excellence" in the Park City Film Music Festival, Utah,  in 2006.

Recently, Calderón has been double nominee for "best music in short film – animation" for TIN CAN HEART, and for "best music in documentary" for TIERRA DE OFICIOS (land of professions) on the prestigious "Jerry Goldsmith Awards" of the V International Film Music Festival Ciudad de Úbeda.

Musical career
2009

 Composition of the soundtrack for the short film "Erase Love", directed by Javier Ideami in the Bali island (Indonesia)
 Composition of the song "Frozen Magic", for the Christmas Music Compilation "Lost Frontier Christmas Sampler 2009", available at www.lostfrontier.com
 Composition of the music for the trailer of TV Series "Sangre y Amor"
 "Tin Can Heart" and "Tierra de Oficios", nominated as "Best Animation Soundtrack" and "Best Documentary Soundtrack" at the V International Film Music Festival in Úbeda
 Congressman in the Composition Workshop by Conrado Xalabarder, Patrick Doyle, James Shearman, Wataru Hokoyama, Alejandro Vivas and Michael Giacchino at the V International Film Music Festival in Úbeda
 Original Score for the short film Estocolmo, directed by Jesús Manuel Fuentes Cortés.
 Original Score for the short film Dios Lo Ve Todo, directed by Aída Argüelles.
 Original Score for the short film Las Interioridades, directed by Darío Galo.

2008

 "Cinquecento", "Spiritu", "Le Troubadour", "Death's March", "Terra Floret", "Malevolentia" and "Old Flavours", have been included on the documentary La Recreación, directed by Pedro Sánchez for GrafXdigital.
 "Mother Earth", "Romanza", "Prologue", "Embrujo" and "CrossPiece" have been included on the documentary Recordando el Ayer, directed by Pedro Sánchez for GrafXdigital.
 "Almería", "A Modern Tale", "Enlightenment", "Epic Days", "First Contact", "Terra Floret" and "Thoughts", have been included on a documentary titled Dos Hombres y un Motor, directed by Miguel González.
 Composition for the logo of Ideami Films.
 Original score for the short film La Última Cena, directed by Javier Ideami.
 Original score for the short film El Problema, directed by Adrián Gutiérrez.
 Original score for the 3D animation short film Tin Can Heart, with Karel Segers. Directed by Rod March.
 Composed four hours of music for the documentary series Tierra de Oficios, produced by Tiquitoc Producciones.

2007

 Original score for the short film La Gran Osa, directed by Alex Just.
 Main theme for a pilot TV series titled "Ven al baño y te lo cuento".
 The "Dry Sky" soundtrack wins the "Gold Medal for Excellence" award on the 4th annual Park City Film Music Festival, in Utah.

2006
 "LostFrontier Christmas sampler 2006" is a Christmas Music compilation where you can find my theme "Snowflakes", that has been composed exclusively for this album.
 Congresist in the II International Film Music Festival "City of Úbeda", where the "Dry Sky" soundtrack is nominated for the "Best Short Film Soundtrack 2006" award.
 "La Noche de los Tiempos", "Mother Earth", "Acuario" and "Embrujo", have been included on an interactive CD from the book "Guía Turística de Ciudad Rodrigo"] written by Nicolás Calvo.
 Original Score for the short film "Las Bellas Durmientes", directed by José Albaina.

2005

 Original Score for the 3D animation short film "Dry Sky", directed by Rob Dollase.
 Congresist in the I Congress of Film Music "Ciudad de Úbeda"].
 "Lost Frontier sampler 02" is a compilation that includes my theme "Goddesses".

2004

 "The Gate" is included on "Torre Nueva. La Caida del Tiempo", a documentary directed by Miguel Lobera.
 "Terra Floret" is included on "Singapore River through the eye of the Merlion", a Chinese documental.
 Collaboration in "Volver a Villaro", a documentary directed by José Javier Pérez Prieto.

2003

 Composition for the BSO Spirit Hymn Contest: "A Modern Tale".
 "Exoniqe" is a compilation CD that includes my theme "Inside the Maze".
 Composition of the theme "The Gate" for "Electronic Tour", a compilation CD created by Fairlight Jarre.

2002

 "V Siglos" concert in La Puebla de Cazalla (Sevilla) on 29 November 2002.
 Recording of "V Siglos" CD.

2001

 Performance on the IV Rendez Vous in Maracena (Granada), organized by Fairlight Jarre on 28 July 2001.

2000

 "La Última Centuria" concert in La Puebla de Cazalla (Sevilla) on 20 December 2000.
 Recording of "La Última Centuria" CD.
 PC ACTUAL magazine features three themes composed by Jesús Calderón in the July–August issue: "One Planet", "Enlightenment" and "A Couple of Souls" are recorded in a special MP3 interactive CD included with the magazine.

1999

 Recording of "Last Times" CD.
 Recording of "About Cults" CD.

1998

 Recording of "Intimist Context" CD.

1997

 "Sala Victoria" Inauguration concert in La Puebla de Cazalla (Sevilla) on 9 December 1997.

Soundtracks
2013

Special Monsters in the Night (Miguel Lázaro Bernuy)
Aquel Fin de Semana (Ferran Brooks)
Freddy (Miguel Cáceres)
Paciencia (Ricardo Barby)
24 Horas con Lucía (Marcos Cabotá)
M is for Malthusianism (Ferran Brooks)
Obra 67 (David Sainz)
Sanchicorrota (Íñigo Floristán)
Grises (Jesús Rabasco)
Caminante, No Hay Camino (Tole Alonso)
Así que Pasen Cinco Años (Álvaro Delso)
¡Formen Fila! (Raúl Mancilla) Avenate Producciones
¡Ey, Muñeca! (Ricardo Barby)
The Parable of the Pharisee and the Tax Collector (Rod March) Max7
Jesus and the Paralytic (Rod March) Max7
Familie (Álvaro Delso)
Arte Psicoilustrativo (Aída Argüelles) Look&Byte
2012

Bastille (Javier Castelló)
Feel at Home (María Doukeli)
The Parable of the Talents (Rod March) Max7
La Verdadera Revolución (Pablo Sola)
Halowin (Paco Torres)
VIII Triatlón Titán (Pedro Sánchez) GrafXDigital
A Good Karma Story (María Doukeli)
The Weight of Light (Javier Ideami) Ideami Films
2011

Moondance (Rod March)
Ataque de Amor (Aída Argüelles)
2010

Rosa (Jesús Manuel Fuentes Cortés) Gluten Free Film
Today (Simon Hood) Max7
Erase Love (Javier Ideami) Ideami Films
The Long Goodbye (Javier Ideami) Ideami Films
The Parable of the Lost Sheep (Rod March) Max7
The Parable of the Sower (Rod March) Max7
2009

Erase Love (Javier Ideami) Ideami Films
Estocolmo (Jesús Manuel Fuentes Cortés) Gluten Free Film
Dios lo ve Todo (Aída Argüelles) Peek-a-boo
Las Interioridades (Darío Galo) Lucifer Films / Koala Publicidad

2008

Recordando el Ayer (Pedro Sánchez) Grafxdigital
La Recreación (Pedro Sánchez) Grafxdigital
Dos Hombres y un Motor (Miguel González)
La Última Cena (Javier Ideami) Ideami Films / Full Emotions Entertainment
El Problema (Adrián Gutiérrez)
Tin Can Heart (Rod March) Ozzywood Films
Tierra de Oficios (Tiquitoc Producciones)

2007

La Gran Osa (Alex Just)

2006

Las Bellas Durmientes (José Albaina) Látigo
Dry Sky (Rob Dollase)

Discography
Decade I - 10 Years of Film Music (2017)
V Siglos  (2002)
La Última Centuria (2001)
Last Times (2000)
About Cults (1999)
Intimist Context (1998)

– Compilations –

Lost Frontier Christmas Sampler 2006 (2006)
Lost Frontier Sampler 02 (2005)
Exoniqe (2003)

Sources
 Official Website "jesuscalderon.com"
 
 Interview in www.lostfrontier.org
 "V Siglos" CD review in www.lostfrontier.org
 "V Siglos" CD review in "En el Aire" Radio Station – Music Magazine
 Nominee for "Jerry Goldsmith Awards" 2006: Jerry Goldsmith Awards Historical
 Winner of "Gold Medal for Excellence" in Park City Film Music Festival
 Nominee Artist Page in the "Jerry Goldsmith Awards" 2009
 Profile in Lost Frontier's Wikipedia

External links
 Official website: www.jesuscalderon.com
 Facebook Official Page
 Website in Last.FM
 Channel in YouTube
 Online Shop in CD Baby

Spanish film score composers
Male film score composers
1976 births
Living people
Spanish male musicians